This is a list of all managers of FC Astana.

Managerial history 
, Managers in italics were hired as caretakers.

References

FC Astana managers
 
Astana
FC Astana managers